"The Circular Ruins" (original Spanish title: "Las ruinas circulares") is a short story by Argentine author Jorge Luis Borges. First published in the literary journal Sur in December 1940, it was included in the 1941 collection The Garden of Forking Paths and the 1944 collection Ficciones. It was first published in English in View (Series V, No. 6 1946), translated by Paul Bowles.

Epigraph

The story's epigraph is taken from Chapter 4 of Through the Looking-Glass by Lewis Carroll: "And if he left off dreaming about you...". It comes from the passage in which Tweedledee points out the sleeping Red King to Alice, and claims she is simply a character in his dream.

Plot
A man arrives by canoe at the burned ruins of an ancient temple. The temple is centered on the statue of an ambiguous deity that appears to be a tiger or a horse. The man immediately falls asleep; his goal, the narrator reveals, is to "dream a man... in his minute entirety and impose him on reality." Local villagers bring the man food, and he spends most of his time sleeping in the ruins.

At first, the man dreams that he is addressing a group of pupils on anatomy, cosmography, and magic; he hopes to find among his pupils "a soul worthy of participating in the universe." The man eventually narrows the group of students down to a boy who resembles him, but soon finds himself stricken with insomnia and unable to continue dreaming.

After taking a rest to regain his strength, the man attempts a different tactic: he begins to dream a man piece by piece, beginning with his heart and slowly adding other organs and features. The process takes over a year and is painstaking. At a point of frustration, the man consults the temple's deity, which in a dream is revealed to be a multifaceted deity known as "Fire" that also can appear as a bull, a rose, and a storm. Fire promises the man that he will bring the dreamed one into reality, and that everyone but Fire and the dreamer will believe the conjured man to be flesh and blood. Fire demands that after the conjured man's education is finished he be sent to another ruined temple downstream "so that some voice would glorify him in that deserted edifice."

The man spends two years instructing the conjured man, whom he comes to view as his son. Though he secretly dreads their separation, the man eventually sends his son to the second temple. Before he does so, though, he destroys his son's memory of his apprenticeship, "so that his son should never know he is a phantom, so that he shall think of himself as a man like any other."

The man remains at his temple and hears word from travelers of his son, who is reportedly able to walk on fire without being burned. Though the man still worries his son will find out his true origins, his fears are interrupted by a forest fire that emerges from the south and envelops the ruined temple. Accepting death, the man walks into the flames. He feels no pain and realizes "with relief, with humiliation, with terror" that he too is an illusion, and that someone else is dreaming him.

Themes

The short story deals with themes that recur in Borges's work: idealism, the manifestation of thoughts in the "real world", meaningful dreams, and immortality. The manifestation of thoughts as objects in the real world was a theme in "Tlön, Uqbar, Orbis Tertius", but here Borges takes it to another level: the manifestation of human beings rather than simple objects.

The story also seems to symbolize writers as creators who engender one another and whose existence and originality would be impossible without their predecessors, a theme he wrote about in other works such as "Pierre Menard, Author of the Quixote", another short story from the Ficciones collection.

Its treatment of dreaming reality and free will is similar to La vida es sueño, a Spanish play published in 1635 by Pedro Calderón de la Barca.

See also
 Tulpa – an autonomous entity created from one's mind using visualization techniques

References

Bibliography
 
 
 

1940 short stories
Short stories by Jorge Luis Borges
Works originally published in Sur (magazine)